The 2021 New York Red Bulls season was the club's twenty-sixth season in Major League Soccer, the top division of soccer in the United States.

Team information

Squad information

Appearances and goals are career totals from all-competitions.

Roster transactions

In

Out

Total expenditure: $5,750,000

Total revenue: $500,000

Net income: $5,250,000

Draft picks

Preseason and Friendlies

Preseason

Major League Soccer season

Eastern Conference

Overall

Results summary

Matches

MLS Cup Playoffs

U.S. Open Cup

On April 16, US Soccer announced that the tournament would not be held in the spring due to a combination of financial and logistical issues, and that they were evaluating holding the tournament later in the year.

On July 20, US Soccer finally announced that the tournament would be cancelled for 2021 and would resume in 2022.

Competitions summary

Player statistics

As of 20 November 2021.

|-
! colspan="14" style="background:#dcdcdc; text-align:center"| Goalkeepers

|-
! colspan="14" style="background:#dcdcdc; text-align:center"| Defenders

|-
! colspan="14" style="background:#dcdcdc; text-align:center"| Midfielders

|-
! colspan="14" style="background:#dcdcdc; text-align:center"| Forwards

|-
! colspan="14" style="background:#dcdcdc; text-align:center"| Left Club During Season

|}

Top scorers

As of 20 November 2021.

Assist Leaders

As of 20 November 2021.
This table does not include secondary assists.

Shutouts 

As of 20 November 2021.

Disciplinary record 

As of 20 November 2021.

References

New York Red Bulls
New York Red Bulls
New York Red Bulls
New York Red Bulls seasons